Brother Sister is a 1994 album by Brand New Heavies 

Brother Sister or variants may also refer to:
Brother, Sister, album by MewithoutYou  
Brother/Sister, album by Hymns  
"Brother, Sister", single by Sahara Beck
The Brother/Sister Plays trilogy Tarell Alvin McCraney

See also
Brother & Sister